Harichandra is a 1998 Indian Tamil-language film directed by Cheyyar Ravi. The film stars Karthik and Meena, while Priya Raman, Chinni Jayanth, Vivek, Delhi Ganesh, and Sathyapriya play supporting roles. It was later remade in Telugu as Harischandraa, starring J. D. Chakravarthy and Raasi.

Plot 
The movie is about Harichandra (Karthik), who always lies and cheats everyone. However, nobody knows that he is a big liar and a cheat. Because of this, they still continue to believe him. Then, Harichandra meets a school principal named Nandhini (Meena) for a shooting purpose. Later, he falls in love with her; thus, he tries to cheat and lie to impress her. Unfortunately, for him, Nandhini was clever enough to identify all his lies and cheats, but no matter what, they still reunite again after every quarrel and fight. Quarrels and fights lasted until their wedding moment. Eventually at the end, everyone knew that even though Harichandra lies and cheats people, he is still a good human being. Thus, Harichandra and Nandhini got married and lived happily.

Cast 

Karthik as Harichandra
Meena as Nandhini
Priya Raman as Chitra
Chinni Jayanth as Sundaram
Vivek as Gopal
Vaiyapuri as Muthu
Delhi Ganesh as Harichandra's father
Sathyapriya as Harichandra's mother
Anand as Joseph
Thalaivasal Vijay as Raghu, Chitra's brother
Janagaraj as Doctor
Vinu Chakravarthy as Anthony
Thyagu as General Manager
Mohan V. Ram
Kavithalaya Krishnan
T. S. Raghavendra

Soundtrack
Music is composed by band named Agosh, consisting of three artists R. Anand, Gopal Rao and Shaleen.

 "Harichandran Varraan" — Gopal Rao
 "Mundhaanai Saelai" - Mano, K. S. Chithra
 "Kaadhal " - Swarnalatha
 "Naadodi Paattu Paada" — S. P. Balasubrahmanyam
 "Enna Idhu Kanavaa" - Mano, Sujatha

Reception
Geocities wrote "The story (by Jeevakumaran) of this movie is different from the others and that makes it interesting to watch. It has been well narrated by a clear and non-dragging (except for the song sequences) screenplay (by Cheyyar Ravi and G. Thiagarajan) with natural dialogues and a smooth direction (both by Cheyyar Ravi). 'Cheyyar' Ravi has done a good job."

References

1998 films
Tamil films remade in other languages
1990s Tamil-language films
Indian comedy films
1998 comedy films